Girardeau is a French surname. Notable people with the surname include:
Arnett E. Girardeau (1929–2017), American dentist and politician
Émile Girardeau (1882–1970), French engineer
Isabella Girardeau, opera soprano in the 1711 premiere of Rinalso
John Girardeau (18251898), American Presbyterian minister and theologian
Marvin D. Girardeau (19302015), quantum physicist and research professor at the University of Arizona

See also
Cape Girardeau, a city in southeast Missouri, United States
Girardot (disambiguation)